The 1976 North Dakota gubernatorial election was held on November 2, 1976. Incumbent Democrat Arthur A. Link defeated Republican nominee Richard Elkin with 51.58% of the vote.

Primary elections
Primary elections were held on September 7, 1976.

Democratic primary

Candidates
Arthur A. Link, incumbent Governor

Results

Republican primary

Candidates
Richard Elkin, North Dakota Public Service Commissioner
Herb Geving

Results

General election

Candidates
Major party candidates
Arthur A. Link, Democratic
Richard Elkin, Republican 

Other candidates
Martin K. Vaaler, American

Results

References

1976
North Dakota
Gubernatorial